The Daily Mail Trans-Atlantic Air Race was a race between London, UK and New York City, USA to commemorate the 50th Anniversary of the first trans-atlantic crossing by John Alcock and Arthur Brown.

The race
Organised by the Daily Mail newspaper, the race was held between 4 and 11 May 1969, although named an air race it was actually a race of individuals between the Post Office Tower in London to the Empire State Building in New York. Each of the individuals or "Runners" had to use some form of air transport. With a number of different categories a total of 21 prizes could be won. A number of point-to-point world records for aircraft were broken.

The shortest overall time between London and New York was by Squadron Leader Tom Lecky-Thompson flying a Royal Air Force Hawker Siddeley Harrier in 6 hours 11 minutes. The shortest time between New York and London was by Lieutenant Commander Peter Goddard, a passenger in a Royal Navy McDonnell Douglas Phantom (callsign 'Royal Blue 3', serial XT859) in 5 hours 11 minutes.

Civilian competitors
The first civilian competitor to leave London was Anne Alcock, the niece of Sir John Alcock. She was followed by a number of other runners including Stirling Moss, Mary Rand and Sheila Scott, who used her own private aircraft.

Royal Navy

The Royal Navy entered three "runners" each to be flown across the Atlantic in a McDonnell Douglas Phantom. The navy runners used Phantoms which flew from the Floyd Bennet Naval Air Station to Wisley Aerodrome and were refuelled by Handley Page Victor aerial tankers over the Atlantic.

On 11 May 1969 a Royal Navy Phantom of 892 Naval Air Squadron set a new world air speed record between New York and London in 4 hours and 46 minutes.

The Vickers Alcock and Brown trophy was awarded to Lieutenant Commander Peter Goddard for his 5 hour 11 minute crossing which was the fastest West to East crossing.

Royal Air Force
The Royal Air Force decided to use the unique Vertical Take Off and Landing capability of the Hawker Siddeley Harrier. The Harrier used a coal yard next to St Pancras station  in London and landed on the quayside of the Bristol Basin in New York.

London to New York

New York to London

Notes

References

External links
The Atlantic Race - Details of Categories in the "Daily Mail" event - 1969 Flight pre-race article
Harrier at St Pancras? - a 1969 news item in Flight about the probable take-off point for the RAF's Harrier entry
Air Race Record news of the unofficial New York - London record set by the Royal Navy Phantom
Daily Mail Trans-Atlantic Record Holder 1969 From an article in the FAAOA News Sheet September 2009, Doug "Stormy" Fairweather, Anthony "Robbie" Roberts

Air races
Aviation history of the United Kingdom
1969 in aviation
History of the Atlantic Ocean
1969 in London
1969 in New York City